The Gambia competed at the 1992 Summer Olympics in Barcelona, Spain.

Competitors
The following is the list of number of competitors in the Games.

Athletics

Men
Track & road events

References

External links
 

Gambia
1992
Oly